José María Rubín Zubiri Jr. (born August 14, 1940), more commonly known simply as Jose Maria Zubiri Jr. or Jose Zubiri Jr., is a Filipino businessman and politician who is the incumbent representative of Bukidnon's 3rd congressional district in the Northern Mindanao region of the Philippines, a post he previously held three times. He was also the governor of the same province from 2001-2010 and from 2013-2022.

Early life and education

Zubiri was born on August 11, 1940, in Kabankalan, Negros Occidental to Jose Zubiri Sr. and Rosa Rubin. He spent his elementary years in Kabankalan Elementary School and finished his secondary education at La Salle College-Bacolod (now University of St. La Salle) in Bacolod. He was a graduate of Bachelor of Science in Management at De La Salle University in Manila. His family is of Basque and Castilian heritage.

Aside from his native Hiligaynon, Zubiri is also fluent in Cebuano, Tagalog and English.

Business career
Before Zubiri entered politics, he worked as an employee for different business firms. He moved to Bukidnon and was an Executive Vice President of the Bukidnon Sugar Milling Company (BUSCO). He was also the chairman of Valle Escondida Farms from 1979 to 1988 and the president of Rancho Mercedes Inc. from 1983 to 1988. Currently, aside from being governor, he still is the president of the following corporations:
Urban Green Inc.
Services Cleaners Inc.
SGABI
Sugarcane Farmers of Bukidnon Multi-Purpose Cooperative

Politics
Zubiri's political career began by becoming an Assemblyman in Batasang Pambansa from 1984 to 1986. He served as a Representative of the third district of Bukidnon for three consecutive terms, from 1987 to 1998. In 2001, he won as Governor and served 3 terms until 2010. He then run and won as vice governor until 2013. He then again run for governor in the 2013 elections and won. He was re-elected in 2016 and 2019.

Personal life

Zubiri is married to socialite Maria Victoria "Vicky" Fernandez who was born in Libon, Albay but raised in Bukidnon. They have five children: Jose Maria III, who also became a Representative of the third district of Bukidnon; Manuel Antonio, who was the Representative of the third district of Bukidnon from 2019 to 2022; Juan Miguel, who is an incumbent Senate President; Beatrice; and Stephanie, a columnist and television host. Zubiri's nephew includes former Malaybalay City Mayor Ignacio "Iñaki" W. Zubiri.

References

People from Bukidnon
People from Negros Occidental
1940 births
Living people
Filipino people of Spanish descent
Members of the House of Representatives of the Philippines from Bukidnon
Governors of Bukidnon
De La Salle University alumni
University of St. La Salle alumni
Members of the Batasang Pambansa
Visayan people